Frans Leonardo Sisita (born ) is a South African professional rugby union player, currently playing with the . His regular position is flanker.

Career

Youth and Varsity Shield

Sisita represented Bloemfontein-based side  at the Under-18 Academy Week tournaments in 2007 and 2008. He then played club rugby for university side , representing them in the Varsity Shield tournament from 2011 to 2014. Sisita was a regular member of the side as they won the competition three times in four seasons and winning promotion to the Varsity Cup in 2014.

Griffons and Griquas

In 2013, Sisita was included in the  squad for the 2013 Currie Cup First Division competition.

In 2014, Sisita was called into the  squad during the 2014 Vodacom Cup competition during an injury crisis for the Kimberley-based outfit.

He was a key member of their 2014 Currie Cup First Division-winning side. He played in the final and helped the Griffons win the match 23–21 to win their first trophy for six years.

References

1990 births
Living people
People from Kagisano-Molopo Local Municipality
South African rugby union players
Rugby union flankers
Griffons (rugby union) players
Griquas (rugby union) players
Rugby union players from North West (South African province)